Liu Chih-kung is a Taiwanese diplomat.

Early life
Liu obtained his bachelor's degree in diplomacy from National Chengchi University in 1972. He then continued his study in the same university and obtained his master's degree and doctoral degree in political science in 1975 and 1983 respectively.

Career
Liu was Taiwanese representative to Mongolia until 2008, when he was moved to the Czech Republic. By May 2010, Liu became the deputy secretary-general of the National Security Council. In 2012, Liu was named representative of the Republic of China to Canada. He was the ROC representative to the United Kingdom from July 2014 to May 2016.

See also
 Ministry of Foreign Affairs (Republic of China)

References

Living people
Representatives of Taiwan to the United Kingdom
Year of birth missing (living people)
National Chengchi University alumni
Representatives of Taiwan to Canada
Representatives of Taiwan to the Czech Republic
Representatives of Taiwan to Mongolia